17th Central Committee may refer to:
Central Committee of the 17th Congress of the All-Union Communist Party (Bolsheviks), 1934–1939
17th Central Committee of the Chinese Communist Party, 2007–2012